Kazuhiro Nakamura (born July 16, 1979) is a retired Japanese mixed martial artist who competed as a Middleweight in DREAM, and is a former DEEP Middleweight Champion. He fought out of the Yoshida Dojo and also competed in the Pride Fighting Championships, the Ultimate Fighting Championship and the Sengoku Raiden Championship.  His primary style is judo, in which he holds a third dan black belt under Hidehiko Yoshida.

Career
Starting judo at 10 years old, Nakamura went to train under Katsuhiko Kashiwazaki and enter the Fukuyama University team. He became a professional judoka under the sponsorship of Keiyo Gas and competed at national and international level, placing third at the Japanese championships at 100+. His career in judo lasted until 2002, when he met Hidehiko Yoshida and became a member of his Yoshida Dojo.

PRIDE Fighting Championships
Nakamura made his MMA debut at PRIDE 25 against Antônio Rogério Nogueira, losing by submission in the second round. He has also lost to Nogueira in a rematch at PRIDE Bushido 4. His career in PRIDE was notable for fighting many of PRIDE's top fighters, including Wanderlei Silva, Maurício Rua, Dan Henderson, and Josh Barnett. His final fight in PRIDE was a decision loss to Maurício Rua at PRIDE Shockwave 2006. He was known for his flashy entrances, often coming to the ring wearing sunglasses and accompanied by penguin mascots.

Ultimate Fighting Championship
Nakamura made his debut in the UFC at UFC 76 against Lyoto Machida. His first apparition in the promotion was specially notable for his entrance and attire choices, coming to the cage wearing an ornated kimono, a jingasa hat and a gas mask before taking them off to reveal floral print shorts. He also carried a wagasa umbrella and exhibited a haircut adopted from Japanese comedian Toru Hotohara. During the fight, Nakamura absorbed punishment and avoided several possible finishes, but he lost by unanimous decision. After the contest, Nakamura would be suspended and fined $500 by the CSAC for failing a drug test for marijuana. Kazuhiro would protest the results, but it was not revoked.

His next fight in the UFC was a loss by TKO (injury) to Rameau Thierry Sokoudjou at UFC 84. He was subsequently released by the promotion.

Sengoku Raiden Championship
After a three-fight losing stint which included losses to future UFC Light Heavyweight Champions Lyoto Machida and Maurício Rua, Nakamura decided to debut at a new weight class Middleweight (185 lbs) after having spent his entire career at Light Heavyweight.

Nakamura debuted at Sengoku: Fifth Battle as an entrant in the inaugural Middleweight Grand prix eliminating British Paul Cahoon. He returned at Sengoku - Sixth battle as part of the final four. Kazuhiro Nakamura defeated fellow countryman Yuki Sasaki via unanimous decision and booked a spot later that evening in the final. Nakamura fought against tournament favourite Jorge Santiago and took him to the third round before losing via KO at 0:49 of the third round.

Nakamura Returned at Sengoku: Ninth Battle in a title eliminator that saw the winner rematch champion Jorge Santiago.  Nakamura was stunned by Kazuo Misaki and lost via submission in the first round.

DREAM
A farewell event for Nakamura's teacher, Hidehiko Yoshida, was held on April 25, 2010. Nakamura defeated Yoshida via unanimous decision.

Nakamura made his return at Dream 17 to face UFC vet Gerald Harris.  He lost the fight via split decision.

DEEP
On October 19, 2012, Nakamura made his debut in DEEP, where he defeated Ryuta Sakurai by majority decision. On February 16, 2013, Nakamura defeated Young Choi to win the vacant DEEP Middleweight Championship which is the first title of his career.

Nakamura faced Daijiro Matsui on June 30, 2013 at DEEP: King Kaz Fight in Fukuyama. Nakamura won via KO in the first round.

On August 25, 2013, Nakamura faced Henry Miller at DEEP: 63 Impact. Nakamura won the bout via first-round knockout.

Nakamura then faced Yuji Sakuragi at DEEP: Cage Impact 2013 on November 24, 2013. Nakamura won by arm triangle choke submission in the third round.

Nakamura was defeated by Ken Hasegawa via majority decision on March 22, 2014 at DEEP: 65 Impact.

On July 21, 2014, Nakamura faced Seigo Mizuguchi at DEEP: Cage Impact 2014 and won via second round corner stoppage.

Nakamura faced Yoshiyuki Nakanishi on December 21, 2014 in DEEP. He lost the fight by unanimous decision and retired from MMA competition after the fight.

Professional wrestling
On February 22, 2014, Nakamura made a one-off professional wrestling appearance for the Wrestle-1 promotion, teaming with Masakatsu Funaki, Manabu Soya and Seiya Sanada in an eight-man tag team match, where they defeated Desperado (Masayuki Kono, Kazma Sakamoto, René Duprée and Ryouji Sai).

Championships and accomplishments
DEEP
DEEP Middleweight Championship (1 time)
Sengoku
2008 Sengoku Middleweight Gran Prix Runner Up
PRIDE FC
2005 PRIDE Middleweight Grand Prix Quarterfinalist

Mixed martial arts record

|-
| Loss
| align=center| 21–13
| Yoshiyuki Nakanishi
| Decision (unanimous)
| Deep: 70 Impact
| 
| align=center| 3
| align=center| 5:00
| Tokyo, Japan
|  Loss DEEP Middleweight Championship.
|-
| Win
| align=center| 21–12
| Seigo Mizuguchi
| TKO (corner stoppage)
| Deep: Cage Impact 2014
| 
| align=center| 2
| align=center| 3:25
| Tokyo, Japan
| 
|-
| Loss
| align=center| 20–12
| Ken Hasegawa
| Decision (majority)
| Deep: 65 Impact
| 
| align=center| 3
| align=center| 5:00
| Tokyo, Japan
| For the DEEP Megaton Championship.
|-
| Win
| align=center| 20–11
| Yuji Sakuragi
| Submission (arm-triangle choke)
| Deep: Cage Impact 2013
| 
| align=center| 3
| align=center| 2:49
| Tokyo, Japan
| 
|-
| Win
| align=center| 19–11
| Henry Miller
| KO (punch)
| Deep: 63 Impact
| 
| align=center| 1
| align=center| 4:42
| Tokyo, Japan
| 
|-
| Win
| align=center| 18–11
| Daijiro Matsui
| KO (knee and punches)
| Deep: King Kaz Fight in Fukuyama
| 
| align=center| 1
| align=center| 1:30
| Hiroshima, Japan
| 
|-
| Win
| align=center| 17–11
| Young Choi
| Decision (unanimous)
| Deep: 61 Impact
| 
| align=center| 3
| align=center| 5:00
| Tokyo, Japan
| Won vacant DEEP Middleweight Championship.
|-
| Win
| align=center| 16–11
| Ryuta Sakurai
| Decision (majority)
| Deep: 60 Impact
| 
| align=center| 3
| align=center| 5:00
| Tokyo, Japan
| 
|-
| Loss
| align=center| 15–11
| Gerald Harris
| Decision (split)
| Dream 17
| 
| align=center| 3
| align=center| 5:00
| Saitama, Japan
| 
|-
| Win
| align=center| 15–10
| Karl Amoussou
| Decision (unanimous)
| Dream 15
| 
| align=center| 2
| align=center| 5:00
| Saitama, Saitama, Japan
| 
|-
| Win
| align=center| 14–10
| Hidehiko Yoshida
| Decision (unanimous)
| Astra: Yoshida's Farewell
| 
| align=center| 3
| align=center| 5:00
| Tokyo, Japan
| 
|-
| Loss
| align=center| 13–10
| Kazuo Misaki
| Technical Submission (guillotine choke)
| World Victory Road Presents: Sengoku 9
| 
| align=center| 1
| align=center| 3:03
| Saitama, Saitama, Japan
| 
|-
| Loss
| align=center| 13–9
| Jorge Santiago
| TKO (punches)
| World Victory Road Presents: Sengoku 6
| 
| align=center| 3
| align=center| 0:49
| Saitama, Saitama, Japan
| Sengoku Middleweight Grandprix 2008 Final Round.
|-
| Win
| align=center| 13–8
| Yuki Sasaki
| Decision (unanimous)
| World Victory Road Presents: Sengoku 6
| 
| align=center| 3
| align=center| 5:00
| Saitama, Saitama, Japan
| Sengoku Middleweight Grandprix 2008 Semifinal Round.
|-
| Win
| align=center| 12–8
| Paul Cahoon
| Decision (unanimous)
| World Victory Road Presents: Sengoku 5
| 
| align=center| 3
| align=center| 5:00
| Tokyo, Japan
| Sengoku Middleweight Grandprix 2008 Opening Round. Drops to Middleweight.
|-
| Loss
| align=center| 11–8
| Rameau Thierry Sokoudjou
| TKO (leg injury)
| UFC 84
| 
| align=center| 1
| align=center| 5:00
| Las Vegas, Nevada, United States
| 
|-
| Loss
| align=center| 11–7
| Lyoto Machida
| Decision (unanimous)
| UFC 76
| 
| align=center| 3
| align=center| 5:00
| Anaheim, California, United States
| 
|-
| Loss
| align=center| 11–6
| Maurício Rua
| Decision (unanimous)
| Pride FC - Shockwave 2006
| 
| align=center| 3
| align=center| 5:00
| Saitama, Saitama, Japan
| 
|-
| Win
| align=center| 11–5
| Travis Galbraith
| TKO (knee and punches)
| Pride 32 - The Real Deal
| 
| align=center| 2
| align=center| 1:16
| Las Vegas, Nevada, United States
| 
|-
| Win
| align=center| 10–5
| Yoshihiro Nakao
| Decision (unanimous)
| Pride FC - Final Conflict Absolute
| 
| align=center| 3
| align=center| 5:00
| Saitama, Saitama, Japan
| 
|-
| Win
| align=center| 9–5
| Evangelista Santos
| Submission (americana)
| Pride FC - Critical Countdown Absolute
| 
| align=center| 1
| align=center| 4:49
| Saitama, Saitama, Japan
| 
|-
| Loss
| align=center| 8–5
| Josh Barnett
| Submission (rear-naked choke)
| Pride 31 - Dreamers
| 
| align=center| 1
| align=center| 8:10
| Saitama, Saitama, Japan
| Heavyweight bout.
|-
| Win
| align=center| 8–4
| Yuki Kondo
| Decision (unanimous)
| PRIDE Shockwave 2005
| 
| align=center| 3
| align=center| 5:00
| Saitama, Saitama, Japan
| 
|-
| Win
| align=center| 7–4
| Igor Vovchanchyn
| Decision (unanimous)
| PRIDE Final Conflict 2005
| 
| align=center| 2
| align=center| 5:00
| Saitama, Saitama, Japan
| 
|-
| Loss
| align=center| 6–4
| Wanderlei Silva
| TKO (punches)
| PRIDE Critical Countdown 2005
| 
| align=center| 1
| align=center| 5:24
| Saitama, Saitama, Japan
| PRIDE 2005 Middleweight Grand Prix Quarterfinal.
|-
| Win
| align=center| 6–3
| Kevin Randleman
| Decision (unanimous)
| PRIDE Total Elimination 2005
| 
| align=center| 3
| align=center| 5:00
| Osaka, Japan
| PRIDE 2005 Middleweight Grand Prix Opening Round.
|-
| Win
| align=center| 5–3
| Stefan Leko
| TKO (punches)
| PRIDE 29
| 
| align=center| 1
| align=center| 0:54
| Saitama, Saitama, Japan
| 
|-
| Loss
| align=center| 4–3
| Dan Henderson
| TKO (shoulder injury)
| PRIDE 28
| 
| align=center| 1
| align=center| 1:15
| Saitama, Saitama, Japan
| 
|-
| Win
| align=center| 4–2
| Murilo Bustamante
| Decision (unanimous)
| PRIDE Final Conflict 2004
| 
| align=center| 3
| align=center| 5:00
| Saitama, Saitama, Japan
| 
|-
| Loss
| align=center| 3–2
| Antônio Rogério Nogueira
| Decision (split)
| PRIDE Bushido 4
| 
| align=center| 2
| align=center| 5:00
| Nagoya, Japan
| 
|-
| Win
| align=center| 3–1
| Chalid Arrab
| Submission (armbar)
| PRIDE Bushido 3
| 
| align=center| 1
| align=center| 4:45
| Yokohama, Japan
| 
|-
| Win
| align=center| 2–1
| Dos Caras, Jr.
| Decision (unanimous)
| PRIDE 27
| 
| align=center| 3
| align=center| 5:00
| Osaka, Japan
| 
|-
| Win
| align=center| 1–1
| Daniel Gracie
| Decision (unanimous)
| PRIDE Bushido 1
| 
| align=center| 2
| align=center| 5:00
| Saitama, Saitama, Japan
| 
|-
| Loss
| align=center| 0–1
| Antônio Rogério Nogueira
| Submission (armbar)
| PRIDE 25
| 
| align=center| 2
| align=center| 3:49
| Yokohama, Japan
|

References

External links
 PrideFC profile
 
 

1979 births
Living people
Japanese male mixed martial artists
Middleweight mixed martial artists
Light heavyweight mixed martial artists
Heavyweight mixed martial artists
Mixed martial artists utilizing judo
Japanese male judoka
People from Fukuyama, Hiroshima
Deep (mixed martial arts) champions
Ultimate Fighting Championship male fighters